The 2011 Bonnaroo Music Festival was held June 9–12, in Manchester, Tennessee and marked the 10th time the festival has been held since its inception in 2002. This year also marked the first return of the SuperJam since 2008.

Deaths
Two festival-goers perished during the 2011 Bonnaroo Music Festival.  Doctors and law enforcement officials believe the deaths to be drug/heat related.  The death of 24-year-old Christopher Yoder of Raleigh, N.C marks the tenth death the festival has seen in the ten years since its inception.

Line-up

Thursday, June 9
(artists listed from earliest to latest set times)

This Tent:
River City Extension
Wavves
The Knux
J. Cole
Twin Shadow
Childish Gambino
Dâm-Funk & Master Blazter
That Tent:
Futurebirds
Freelance Whales
School of Seven Bells
Band of Skulls
The Walkmen
Deerhunter
The Other Tent:
Hayes Carll
Karen Elson
Best Coast
The Drums
Sleigh Bells
Beats Antique
The Comedy Theatre:
Lewis Black, Ted Alexandro, Eugene Mirman & Tim Minchin
Lewis Black, Kathleen Madigan, Tim Minchin & Hannibal Buress
Henry Rollins, Tig Notaro & Nate Bargatze
420 Comedy Blaze hosted by Cheech Marin w/  Ralphie May, Jay Pharoah & the stars of Workaholics
Cinema Tent:
Over the Top
The Naked Gun: From the Files of Police Squad!
The Last Mountain Film Intro and Q&A by Robert F. Kennedy, Jr. and Bill Haney
Poster Girl
Shampoo
2011 NBA Finals Game 5
Kareem - On the Shoulders of Giants
Superjail from [adult swim]
Dark Side of the Moon / Wizard of Oz
Heavy Metal Parking Lot
The Last Detail
The On Tap Lounge Brewed by Miller Lite:
Uncle Skeleton
Chris Harford and the Band of Changes
Greensky Bluegrass
Kopecky Family Band
MiniBoone
The Reverend Peyton's Big Damn Band
Civil Twilight
The David Mayfield Parade
The Band of Heathens
Solar Stage:
Fresh Trix Breakdancing
Kopecky Family Band
Gypsy Hands Tribal Dance
He Is We
Bonnaroo Beard & Mustache Competition
Cory Chisel and The Wandering Sons
The Pimps of Joytime
African Drum & Dance
Fresh Trix Breakdancing
Gypsy Hands Tribal Dance
Miss Lolly Pop's Burlesque Coterie
The Silent Disco:
DJ Neil Armstrong
Hesta Prynn
DJ Logic
Jared Dietch

Friday, June 10th
(artists listed from earliest to latest set times)

What Stage:
Anthony B
Grace Potter and The Nocturnals
The Decemberists
My Morning Jacket
Arcade Fire
Which Stage:
Sharon Van Etten
Béla Fleck and the Flecktones (the original lineup)
Warren Haynes Band
Ray Lamontagne
Primus
Lil Wayne
This Tent:
Jessica Lea Mayfield
Phosphorescent
Matt & Kim
Atmosphere
Florence + the Machine
Bassnectar
Shpongle Presents Shpongletron Experience
That Tent:
Graveyard
Kylesa
The Sword
Opeth
NOFX
The Black Angels
Pretty Lights
The Other Tent:
Ben Sollee
Justin Townes Earle
Abigail Washburn
Wanda Jackson
The Del McCoury Band and the Preservation Hall Jazz Band
Big Boi
Ratatat
The Comedy Theatre:
420 Comedy Blaze hosted by Cheech Marin w/  Ralphie May, Jay Pharoah & the stars of Workaholics
Lewis Black, Kathleen Madigan, Tim Minchin & Hannibal Buress
Lewis Black, Ted Alexandro, Eugene Mirman & Tim Minchin
Henson Alternative's STUFFED AND UNSTRUNG
Sonic Stage:
New Orleans Allstars
Hayes Carll
Jovanotti
Greensky Bluegrass
The Pimps of Joytime
Freelance Whales
Béla Fleck
Graveyard
Walk the Moon
Cafe Where?:
Deas Vail
Walk the Moon
Hesta Prynn
He Is We
Cinema Tent:
Connected: An Autobiography About Love, Death & Technology
Life in a Day
A Louisiana Fairytale Feat. Danny Clinch & Jim James and the Preservation Hall Jazz Band
SoLa: Louisiana Water Stories Benjamin Jaffe, Preservation Hall Jazz Band, Jon Bowermaster & more!
Aqua Unit Patrol Squad 1 / Squidbillies from [adult swim]
The League Intros: Jon LaJoie, Nick Kroll, Steve Rannazzisi & Paul Scheer
Bellflower
The Whole Bloody Affair
Long Live Lumet: Dog Day Afternoon
The On Tap Lounge Brewed by Miller Lite:
Chancellor Warhol
The Pimps of Joytime
The Black Box Revelation
Kevin Hammond 
Givers
Hanni El Khatib
Bobby Long
Cory Chisel and The Wandering Sons
JEFF the Brotherhood
The Uncalled For
Solar Stage:
Secret Home Party
Gypsy Hands Tribal Dance
Rock The Earth Panel Discussion "Social Change Through Music" 
African Drum and Dance by Mawre & Company
Rock The Earth Interview and Performance: Aunt Martha
Rock The Earth Interview & Performance: Greensky Bluegrass
Eco Fashion Show hosted by Art Institutes
Bonnaroo Beard & Mustache Competition
Civil Twilight
Futurebirds
Gypsy Hands Tribal Dance
Fresh Trix Breakdancing
Miss Lolly Pop's Burlesque Coterie
The Silent Disco:
DJ Neil Armstrong
Jared Dietch
DJ Kraz
DJ Logic

Saturday, June 11th
(artists listed from earliest to latest set times)

What Stage:
Dennis Coffey
Black Uhuru
Wiz Khalifa
The Black Keys
Eminem
Which Stage:
Naomi Shelton & The Gospel Queens
Old Crow Medicine Show
Alison Krauss & Union Station featuring Jerry Douglas
Mumford & Sons
Buffalo Springfield feat. Richie Furay, Stephen Stills, Neil Young, Rick Rosas, Joe Vitale
String Cheese Incident
This Tent:
Black Joe Lewis & the Honeybears
You Choose the Cover.... Leila Broussard vs. The Sheepdogs
Chiddy Bang
Man Man
!!!
Scissor Sisters
Girl Talk
That Tent:
Alberta Cross
The Low Anthem
Deer Tick
Portugal. The Man
Loretta Lynn
Dr. John and The Original Meters and Allen Toussaint performing Desitively Bonnaroo
STS9
The Other Tent:
Hanggai
Forro in the Dark
Jovanotti
Devotchka
Bootsy Collins & the Funk University
Omar Souleyman
Gogol Bordello
The Comedy Theatre:
Henson Alternative's STUFFED AND UNSTRUNG
Donald Glover with Bill Bailey (2 Sets)
The League Live (Paul Scheer, Nick Kroll, Jon Lajoie, Stephen Rannazzisi)
Sonic Stage:
Shahidah Omar
Abigail Washburn & The Village
Alberta Cross
Bobby Long
!!!
Bruce Hornsby
Amos Lee
Chris Harford and the Band of Changes
Civil Twilight
Cafe Where?:
Kellee Maize
Infantree
Sallie Ford and the Sound Outside
J Roddy Walston and the Business
Cinema Tent:
Harold and Maude
Garden State Q&A: Zach Braff
Special Screening: 30 Minutes or Less. Q&A: Aziz Ansari
Vanishing of the Bees Q&A: Director George Langworthy
Robot Chicken from [adult swim]
Saturday Night Fever
8 Mile
New Jack City
Long Live Lumet: Serpico
The On Tap Lounge Brewed by Miller Lite:
Cheer Up Charlie Daniels
Miss Willie Brown
Rotary Downs
Gary Clark Jr.
Lionize
Fences
Cristina Black
tristen
Matthew and the Atlas
Fine Peduncle
Solar Stage:
Fresh Trix Breakdancing
Rock The Earth Panel Discussion "Social Change Through Music" 
Rock The Earth Interview & Performance: Ben Sollee Trio
Rock the Earth: Abigail Washburn & Hanggai
Rock the Earth Interview & Performance: Rotary Downs
Bonnaroo Beard & Mustache Competition
Deas Vail
Andrea Belanger
The Beautiful Girls - Mat McHugh Solo & Acoustic
Fresh Trix Breakdancing
African Drum and Dance by Mawre & Company
Gypsy Hands Tribal Dance
Miss Lolly Pop's Burlesque Coterie
The Silent Disco:
DJ Kraz
Gypsyphonic Disko ft. Ben Ellman
Motion Potion (San Francisco)

Sunday, June 12th
(artists listed from earliest to latest set times)

What Stage:
Mavis Staples
Galactic
Robert Plant & Band of Joy
Widespread Panic
Which Stage:
G. Love & Special Sauce
Amos Lee
Iron & Wine
The Strokes
This Tent:
Smith Westerns
Neon Trees
Daniel Lanois' Black Dub
Cold War Kids
Explosions in the Sky
That Tent:
Railroad Earth
Ryan Bingham
Bruce Hornsby & the Noisemakers
Gregg Allman
Superjam ft. Dan Auerbach and Dr. John
The Other Tent:
The Head and the Heart
Nicole Atkins & the Black Sea
Junip
Robyn
Beirut
The Comedy Theatre:
The League Live (Paul Scheer, Nick Kroll, Jon Lajoie, Stephen Rannazzisi)
John Waters, Tig Notaro & The Gregory Brothers (2 Sets)
Sonic Stage:
Aunt Martha
Fences
Gypsyphonic Disko ft. Ben Ellman
G. Love
Railroad Earth
Nicole Atkins & the Black Sea
Ben Sollee
The White Buffalo
Jamie McLean Band
Cafe Where?:
Andrea Belanger
Lauren Shera
Parkington Sisters
Cinema Tent:
Ghostbusters
Portugal. The Man "Sleep Forever..."
Childrens Hospital from [adult swim]
30 for 30 "Winning Time: Reggie Miller vs. The New York Knicks"
2011 NBA Finals Game 6
The On Tap Lounge Brewed by Miller Lite:
Jamie McLean Band
Shahidah Omar
Aunt Martha
The White Buffalo
The Beautiful Girls – Mat McHugh Solo & Acoustic
Aaron "Woody" Wood
The Apache Relay
Solar Stage:
African Drum and Dance by Mawre & Company
Rock The Earth Panel Discussion "Social Change Through Music" 
Secret Home Party
Rock the Earth Interview & Performance: Rotary Downs
Rock The Earth Interview & Performance: John Bell
Rock The Earth Interview & Performance
Bonnaroo Beard & Mustache Competition
Breakdancing
Gypsy Hands Tribal Dance
The Silent Disco:
Motion Potion (San Francisco)

References

External links
Official website

Bonnaroo Music Festival by year
2011 in American music
2011 music festivals
Bonnaroo
2011 in Tennessee